The 1979 Australian Open was a tennis tournament played on outdoor grass courts at the Kooyong Lawn Tennis Club in Melbourne in Victoria in Australia and was held from 24 December 1979 through 2 January 1980. It was the 68th edition of the Australian Open and the fourth Grand Slam tournament of the year. The singles titles were won by Argentinian Guillermo Vilas and American Barbara Jordan.

Seniors

Men's singles

 Guillermo Vilas defeated  John Sadri, 7–6(7–4), 6–3, 6–2 
• It was Vilas' 4th and last career Grand Slam singles title and his 2nd title at the Australian Open.

Women's singles

 Barbara Jordan defeated  Sharon Walsh, 6–3, 6–3 
• It was Jordan's 1st and only career Grand Slam singles title.

Men's doubles

 Peter McNamara /  Paul McNamee defeated  Paul Kronk /  Cliff Letcher, 7–6, 6–2 
• It was McNamara's 1st career Grand Slam doubles title.
• It was McNamee's 1st career Grand Slam doubles title.

Women's doubles

 Judy Connor Chaloner /  Diane Evers defeated  Leanne Harrison /  Marcella Mesker, 6–1, 3–6, 6–0 
• It was Connor's 1st and only career Grand Slam doubles title.
• It was Evers's 1st and only career Grand Slam doubles title.

Mixed doubles
This event was not held from 1970 until 1985.

References

External links
 Official website

 
 

 
 
December 1979 sports events in Australia
January 1980 sports events in Australia
1979,Australian Open